Gary Evan Knell (born 27 February 1954) was the Chairman of National Geographic Partners. Formerly, he was president and CEO of the National Geographic Society. He joined National Geographic as chief executive in January 2014. He has been a member of the Society's board of trustees since April 2013 and has served on the board of governors of the National Geographic Education Foundation since November 2003.

From 2011 to 2013 he was president and CEO of National Public Radio NPR. Prior to that he served as CEO of Sesame Workshop from 2000–2011.

Early life
Knell graduated from Grant High School in Los Angeles, California, and earned a BA in political science from UCLA in 1975, followed by a law degree from Loyola Law School in L.A. in 1978. While at UCLA, he worked on the school's newspaper, the Daily Bruin.

Career
Before joining National Geographic as president and CEO in 2014, Knell served as president and CEO of National Public Radio from December 2011 to November 2013.

Knell was CEO of Sesame Workshop for 12 years before joining NPR in 2011. He joined the company in 1989 and assumed the role of COO in 1998 before moving into the CEO role in 2000. During his tenure at Sesame, the organization expanded its revenue base, audience and global recognition. Knell was instrumental in focusing the organization on Sesame Street's worldwide mission, including the creation of co-productions in South Africa, India, Northern Ireland and Egypt.

Before joining Sesame Workshop, Knell was managing director of Manager Media International, a print and multimedia publishing company based in Bangkok, Hong Kong, and Singapore. He has also served as senior vice president and general counsel at WNET/Channel 13 in New York, was counsel to the U.S. Senate Judiciary and Governmental Affairs Committees in Washington, D.C., and worked in the California State Legislature and Governor's Office.

Knell is a member of the Council on Foreign Relations. He serves on the boards of Heidrick & Struggles and Common Sense Media as well as the advisory boards of the Military Child Education Coalition and the Pentagon Memorial Fund. He is an adviser to the USC Annenberg School for Communication and Journalism.

A Gordon Grand Fellow at Yale University, Knell was a guest lecturer at Harvard University, Duke University, Southern Methodist University, Carnegie Mellon University, and the University of Puerto Rico. He received honorary doctorates from Kenyon College in Ohio and Mercy College in New York and has served as the commencement speaker at Johns Hopkins University, UCLA, and the University of Texas at Austin.

Knell received a Bachelor of Arts degree in Political Science from UCLA, where he also served as Editorial Director of the UCLA Daily Bruin and was a stringer for the Associated Press. He received a JD from Loyola University School of Law in Los Angeles.

Personal life
Knell is married to Kim Larson, a non-profit fund raiser, and they have four children.

References

1954 births
Living people
Loyola Law School alumni
New York (state) lawyers
Businesspeople from Sacramento, California
NPR
Sesame Workshop people
University of California, Los Angeles alumni
Lawyers from Sacramento, California
Grant High School (Los Angeles) alumni
Disney executives
Mercy College (New York) alumni
American chief executives in the media industry